Harry Potter 20th Anniversary: Return to Hogwarts is a television special released on 1 January 2022 on HBO Max. It is a reunion special for the many cast and crew of the Harry Potter film series, marking the twentieth anniversary of the series' first instalment, The Philosopher's Stone. It was produced by Warner Bros. Unscripted Television in association with Warner Horizon and executive produced by Casey Patterson.

The films' protagonist trio Daniel Radcliffe, Rupert Grint, and Emma Watson appear throughout the special, with surviving principal cast members also included Helena Bonham Carter, Robbie Coltrane, Ralph Fiennes, Jason Isaacs, Gary Oldman, Tom Felton, James Phelps, Oliver Phelps, Mark Williams, Bonnie Wright, Alfred Enoch, Ian Hart, Toby Jones, Matthew Lewis, and Evanna Lynch, producer David Heyman, and filmmakers Chris Columbus, Alfonso Cuarón, Mike Newell, and David Yates. The special also marked Coltrane's final on-screen appearance before his death in October that year.

Cast

The reunion features clips of and pays tribute to cast members who have since died, including Helen McCrory, Alan Rickman, John Hurt, Richard Griffiths and Richard Harris.

Production

Development
In November 2021, Warner Bros. announced Harry Potter 20th Anniversary: Return to Hogwarts, a retrospective special featuring the cast and filmmakers of the Harry Potter film series to celebrate the 20th anniversary of the release of the series' first instalment, Harry Potter and the Philosopher's Stone (2001). The special is produced by Warner Bros. Unscripted Television in association with Warner Horizon and executive produced by Casey Patterson.

Exclusion of J. K. Rowling
J. K. Rowling—the author of the original Harry Potter book series, who had a significant role in the production of the film adaptations—is largely absent from the special. She appears for under thirty seconds in archival footage from her interviews in 2019 and is mentioned by some of the special's interviewees, but no advertisements for the special featured images of her. Critics speculated that this was due to her views on transgender issues and, as The Daily Telegraphs Ed Power put it, consequent "public rebuke by the series' stars". However, Entertainment Weekly reported that Rowling had been invited to appear but she felt that the archival footage was sufficient, with "sources close to the situation" denying that the author's decision was related to the controversy surrounding her remarks on transgender issues.

Filming
The special was filmed at Warner Bros. Studio Tour London – The Making of Harry Potter in Leavesden, England.

Corrections
In the initial release, a childhood image of Emma Roberts taken from Google Images was mistakenly presented as an image of a young Watson, and Oliver and James Phelps are mislabelled as each other. By 3 January, these errors had been corrected in a new version.

Music 
The music for the TV Special was composed by Charlie Mole. In addition, John Williams, who scored the first three Harry Potter movies, newly recorded two of his compositions ("Hedwig’s Theme" and "Harry’s Wondrous World") for the project with the Synchron Stage Orchestra in Vienna, conducted by James Seymour Brett.

Release
Return to Hogwarts was released on HBO Max on 1 January 2022. The special aired on 10 April 2022 on TBS, and on Cartoon Network ahead of the release of Fantastic Beasts: The Secrets of Dumbledore. It was later released on both Blu-ray and DVD on 9 August 2022.

Reception

Critical response
The site's critical consensus reads, "Affectionate and revealing, Return to Hogwarts offers an intimate glimpse into how the making of the Harry Potter franchise delivered its own special kind of magic for those involved." Metacritic, which uses a weighted average, assigned a score of 65 out of 100 based on 11 critics, indicating "generally favorable reviews".

Accolades

References

External links
 
 

2022 television specials
2020s American television specials
Harry Potter (film series)
HBO Max original programming